Rao Surjan Singh was the 14th Raja of Bundi. He was crowned in 1554.

Life 
He was the governor of Ranthambore under the vassalage of the Sisodias of Mewar, until 1568. His son Duda allied with Maharana Pratap, and was defeated by the Mughal Empire after which he fled and Bundi was conferred upon Surjan's son Bhoj.  After not getting any success in conquering the fort of Ranthambore, Emperor Akbar gave this task to Mansingh. Raja Man Singh made a courtesy call to Rao Surjan Singh with a fixed time. On this occasion, Raja Mansingh was accompanied by Akbar himself in the guise of Chobdar, who was recognized by the uncle of Rao Surjan Singh who was present there and was respectfully seated. After the intense consultation of Rao Surjan with Mansingh, the main 10 conditions were laid according to the treaty proposal made.

References 

Maharajas of Bundi
16th-century Indian royalty
History of Rajasthan
1585 deaths